Al Jarnow (born 1945) is an American artist, animator, sculptor, and filmmaker.

Early life and education
He was born in Brooklyn in 1945.

He attended Dartmouth College and the Brooklyn Museum Art School.

Career
Jarnow made his first animated film, “The Owl & the Pussycat,” in 1968. He made his first short film for Sesame Street in 1970. Between the 1970s and the 1990s, Jarnow  produced and/or directed over 100 short films for Sesame Workshop, including "Yak", "Orange", "Floor Tiles", "Perspectives", "Litter Rap", "One Thousand Faces", "Real Cats Drink Milk", "Three Primary Colors", "Rap Animation Numbers", and "Box City Recycling Rap".

Jarnow's films use stop-motion, timelapse, cell animation, and other experimental techniques to bring everyday objects to life and illustrate scientific concepts by blending education and entertainment. 

Jarnow has also been a cover artist for Alfred Hitchcock's Mystery Magazine and Agatha Christie titles. His artwork has been display at New York City's Museum of Modern Art and the Pompidou Center in Paris.

He is an expert in the design of children’s museums. He has created exhibits for such institutions as The National Gallery of Art, ARTitorium, South Fork Natural History Museum, Science World (Vancouver), Brooklyn Children's Museum, Long Island Maritime Museum, San Francisco Exploratorium, Sag Harbor Whaling Museum, Three Village Historical Society, and the DAR Museum. He is one of the founders and designers of the Long Island Children's Museum.

Personal life
Jarnow was born in Brooklyn and now lives in Northport, New York.

Notes

External links
Al Jarnow
Al Jarnow
Al Jarnow

Animators from New York (state)
American television writers
Artists from New York City
Sesame Street crew
Dartmouth College alumni
Brooklyn Museum Art School alumni